Mahali (also before known as Salempur) is a village in Zamania tehsil of Ghazipur district of Uttar Pradesh, India. Salempur was a region in Daudpur but later in 1870 many families came and established the village Mahali and the name was renamed.

References

Villages in Ghazipur district